Tar is a viscous organic black liquid.

Tar or TAR may also refer to:

Science and technology
 Tar (tobacco residue), the partially combusted particulate matter produced by smoking
 tar (computing), a computer archive file format and a program used to handle such files
 Target acquisition radar
 Transverse aeolian ridges, a feature on Mars
 Third Assessment Report of the Intergovernmental Panel on Climate Change (IPCC)

Medicine
 Tengku Ampuan Rahimah Hospital or General Hospital, a government tertiary hospital in Klang, Selangor, Malaysia
 Thrombocytopenia with Absent Radius or TAR syndrome, a genetic disorder
 Tissue-to-air ratio, used in radiation therapy treatment system calibration
 Traumatic aortic rupture, an emergency injury in which the aorta is torn, usually after an impact
 Trans-activation response element, a genetic element bound by Tat protein during HIV transcription

Music
 Tar (band), a 90s indie rock band
 Tar (drum), a drum from North Africa and the Middle East
 Tar (string instrument), a lute of Persian origin used in Iran and the Caucasus
 Tar (Azerbaijani instrument), a long-necked string instrument
 "Tar" (song), by Visage, 1979

Places
 Tar, Hungary, a village
 Tar (Tar-Vabriga), village in Istria County, Croatia
 Tar, Iran (disambiguation), several villages
 Tar River, North Carolina, United States
 Tar (Kyrgyzstan), a tributary of the Kara Darya in Kyrgyzstan
 River Tar, County Tipperary, Ireland
 Tar Rocks, Isle of Portland, Dorset, England
 Tar Island, Ontario, Canada
 Tar Township, Akto County, Kizilsu Kyrgyz Autonomous Prefecture, Xinjiang, China
 Tibet Autonomous Region, a region of the People's Republic of China consisting of most of traditional Tibet
 Tuvan Arat Republic (or the Tuvan/Tuvinian Arat Republic), i.e. the Tuvan People's Republic, a former state in North Asia

Publications
Teen-Age Romances, a 1949 comic book series
 IPCC Third Assessment Report, a 2001 report by the Intergovernmental Panel on Climate Change
 Tar: A Midwest Childhood, a 1926 fictionalized memoir by American author Sherwood Anderson

Transport
 Tar, a common name for asphalt concrete pavement
 TAR Aerolineas, a Mexican airline
 Taranto-Grottaglie Airport (IATA airport code TAR), an airport in Province of Taranto, Italy
 Trans-Asian Railway, a UN project to create an integrated freight railway network across Europe and Asia
 Tunisair (ICAO code TAR), an airline, the flag carrier of Tunisia

Film and television
 The Color of Time, also known as Tar, a 2012 film
 Tár, a 2022 film starring Cate Blanchett as a composer-conductor
 The Amazing Race, a reality television series around the world
 The Amazing Race (U.S. TV series)

People
 Pál Tar (born 1931), Hungarian businessman and diplomat
 Zsolt Tar (born 1993), Hungarian footballer
 TAR, nickname of T. A. Robertson (1909-1994), Scottish MI5 intelligence officer

Other uses
 Jack Tar or Tar, an English synonym for sailor
 Time at risk, a risk measure for corporate finance
 Teen Age Republicans, a youth wing of the US Republican Party
 Tar Tunnel, an abandoned mining tunnel in Coalport, England
 Turnaround (refining), a scheduled shutdown of a plant for revamp

See also
 Tars (disambiguation)